Chosa may refer to:

 Chōsa Station, a railway station of JR Kyushu Nippō Main Line in Aira, Kagoshima, Japan
 chosa herring, Clupea pallasii suworowi, a subspecies of the Pacific herring, Clupea pallasii
 a portable shrine in Japanese festivals
 Children of South Africa (CHOSA), nonprofit charity that locates and supports community-based organizations (CBOs) in South Africa which reach out and take care of orphans and other vulnerable children in South Africa